Australia national field hockey team may refer to:
 Australia men's national field hockey team
 Australia women's national field hockey team